Uruvangal Maralam is a 1983 Indian Tamil-language drama film written, produced and directed by S. V. Ramanan who also composed the film's soundtrack. The film stars Y. G. Mahendran and Suhasini, with stars like Sivaji Ganesan, Kamal Haasan, Rajinikanth and Jaishankar playing different forms of God in guest appearances. It was released on 14 January 1983. The film is based on the 1977 American film Oh, God!.

Plot 

Ramalingam believes in formless God more than anything else in this world and worships all forms of Gods right down to newspaper clippings. He works in a bank where he is constantly mocked. Even his wife looks down upon this habit of his.

He is once called by God, which he initially considers a prank, who tells him that he has to inform people about the various things about to happen in the future. He starts believing that the person he spoke to, in form of Sivaji Ganesan, is God when he is summoned to 18th floor of a 7th floor building through a lift when he is unable to replicate.

Ramalingam starts his task of telling people, but no one believes him in the beginning. However, his "predictions" of train accident, among others, start to happen in real time. Slowly when what he says starts occurring people term him a powerful monk and start coming to him. God takes several other famous actor forms and keeps hinting the world through Ramalingam. One day, God tells Ramalingam that his son is going to die. The tables turn and Ramalingam starts cursing God though he still keeps his faith. In the end, he is arrested as a terrorist for pointing out a train accident before it happened, something one cannot know without inside knowledge. God appears in court which the judge mocks. God disappears in front of all to show he is God and Ramalingam is not insane. God gives Ramalingam his son back saying this is why God no longer interferes in human affairs.

Cast 
Y. G. Mahendran as Ramalingam
Suhasini as Lakshmi
Sivaji Ganesan as God (Guest role)
Kamal Haasan as God (Guest role)
Rajinikanth as God (Guest role)
Jaishankar as God (Guest role)
Vennira Aadai Moorthy as Manager
S. Ve. Shekher
Manorama as Goddess (Guest role)
K. A. Thangavelu as Punnaaku Punniyakotti
Silk Smitha
Loose Mohan
Thengai Srinivasan as Thengai Srinivasan working in Press
Bindu Ghosh as Kuchipudi Sabalam

Production 
Uruvangal Maralam, a remake of the 1977 American film Oh, God!, is Y. G. Mahendran's 100th film as an actor. Sivaji Ganesan, Kamal Haasan, Rajinikanth and Jaishankar played different forms of god in guest appearances. Ganesan's scenes were filmed in one day. Haasan also choreographed one song in the film, "Kamanukku Kaman". This was the first film where Rajinikanth appeared as Raghavendra, a role he would reprise in a full-fledged manner in Sri Raghavendrar (1985).

Soundtrack 
Soundtrack was composed by S. V. Ramanan and lyrics were written by Vairamuthu and Raghu.

References

External links 
 

1980s Tamil-language films
1983 drama films
1983 films
Films about God
Indian drama films
Indian remakes of American films